Mio Mao (pronounced me-o mow [ˈmiː.o mɑu̯]), also known as Mio and Mao, is a stop motion children's television series created by Francesco Misseri in the 1970s, produced using Claymation animation.

The original series was produced by P.M.B.B. and aired on Programma Nazionale in 1974. After Francesco Misseri's production company Misseri Studio acquired Mio Mao in 2000 and remastered series 1 in 2003, Misseri Studio and Associati Audiovisivi created two more series for Channel 5's Milkshake! block in 2005 and 2007. In the United Kingdom, the episodes are narrated and the characters are voiced by Derek Griffiths. Mio Mao airs on BabyFirst in the United States.

Plot 
Each episode is approximately five minutes long and focuses on the kittens Mio and Mao. As the episode progresses, they discover a variety of mysterious animals and objects on the other side. The garden changes appearance depending on the theme of the episode, or the animal or object featured.

The kittens go to investigate alone, they sometimes forget about the animal or object and wander off to look at the scenery. After a while, they get there but return scared, before watching from a distance and discovering that the scary item was either a friendly animal or a fun object.

Often, near the end of the episode, the animal or object will need help, and Mio and Mao come to their rescue, then invite the animal or object to come play with them. Gracious, the animal or object follows them as they squish and bounce back to the other side of the toy store, posing together and looking at the viewers as the episode draws to a close, with the words “THE END”.

List of episodes

Series 1 (1974) 
 The Peacock
 The Little Lamb
 The Ants
 The Chameleon
 The Beehive
 The Spider
 The Tortoise
 The Caterpillar
 The Cicada
 The Egg
 The Snake
 The Dog
 The Dormouse
 The Polyp
 The Hippopotamus
 The Squirrel
 The Monkey
 The Hedgehog
 The Shell
 The Tadpole
 The Snail
 The Owl
 The Mole
 The Beaver
 The Piglet
 The Hare

Series 2 (2005-06) 
 The Fox
 The Worm
 The Anteater
 The Seed
 The Cricket
 The Swan
 The Turkey
 The Crocodile
 The Racoon
 The Crab
 The Penguin
 The Little Bear
 The Christmas Tree
 The Snowman
 The Seal
 The Parrot
 The Mushroom
 The Dragonfly
 The Bat
 The Chestnut
 The Hornet
 The Kangaroo
 The Cow
 The Ladybird
 The Donkey
 The Koala

Series 3 (2006-07) 
 The Deer
 The Elephant
 The Mouse
 The Ostrich
 The Pelican
 The Dove
 The Kingfisher
 The Television
 The Clew
 The Dolphin
 The Ghost
 The Goldfish
 The Zebra
 The Vacuum Cleaner
 The Sky Terrier
 The Sloth
 The Gorilla
 The Jinn
 The Bull
 The Train
 The Little Theater
 The Tap
 The UFO
 The Vulture
 The Piano
 The Dinosaur

Broadcast History
Brazil
Rede Globo (season 1, 1993-2002)
Italy
Rai 1 (1974-1976)
Junior TV (season 1, 2005-2012)
Rai YoYo (assorted episodes, 2013)
United Kingdom
Channel 4 (season 1, 1993)
Milkshake! (Channel 5) (2004-2013)
France
Canal J (season 1, 1999-2002)
Tiji (season 1 & 2, 2000-2006)
France 2
France 3
Finland
Yle TV2 (1978-1993, 2009)
United States
The Family Channel (season 1, 1988-1998)
Pinwheel/Nickelodeon/Nick Jr. (season 1, 1977-1984; 1988-1990)
BabyFirstTV (season 1 & 2, 2006–present)
Asia
JimJam (season 2, 2007-2014)
Poland
JimJam (2020–present)
Turkey
Yumurcak TV (2009-2016)
Germany
ZDF (season 1, 1976)
Japan
NHK (Okaasan to Issho) (1978)
Cartoon Network (2000's)
Czech Republic
JimJam (season 1, 2020 – present)
China
CCTV 4 (season 1 & 2, 1993-1998)
Israel
Noga (season 1, 2018-2019)

References

External links 
 Misseri Studio's YouTube Channel

1974 Italian television series debuts
1974 Italian television series endings
1970s animated television series
1970s Italian television series
2005 British television series debuts
2007 British television series endings
2000s British animated television series
Animated television series about cats
British preschool education television series
Channel 5 (British TV channel) original programming
Clay animation television series
Italian children's animated television series
Stop-motion animated television series
Television series about shapeshifting
Animated television series without speech
Animated preschool education television series
1970s preschool education television series
2000s preschool education television series